The RWS/Sunday Times Watercolour Competition is nationwide competition promoting the art of painting in water-based media.

It was launched in 1988 as the Kaupthing Singer and Friedlander / Sunday Times Watercolour Competition, through sponsorship by Kaupthing Bank and The Sunday Times. Kaupthing ceased to sponsor the prize after the bank was taken over. It is now co-sponsored by the Royal Watercolour Society.

The first prize winner was Tom Coates. Subsequent winners have included Trevor Stubley (1990), Carl Randall (1998, the youngest ever 1st prize winner), Stuart Pearson Wright (1999; third prize), Leslie Worth, and Carol Robertson.

The 2007 winner was Julia Farrer. In 2008, 2,000 works were submitted, with 100 exhibited at the Royal Watercolour Society's Bankside Gallery, and a £25,000 prize fund, that year's winner being Jennifer McRae.

References

Competitions